Barenjegan (also Romanized as Bārenjegān, Bārenjekān, and Bārenjkān) is a village in Petergan Rural District, Central District, Zirkuh County, South Khorasan Province, Iran. At the 2006 census, its population was 1,352, in 284 families.

References 

Populated places in Zirkuh County